The 2021–22 Pittsburgh Penguins season was the 55th season for the National Hockey League team that was established on June 5, 1967.

On March 27, 2022, the Penguins defeated the Red Wings, 11–2, marking the first time the team has scored 11 goals in a game since November 16, 1993. On April 14, 2022, the Penguins clinched their 16th consecutive playoff appearance after a 6–3 win over the New York Islanders. In the First Round, the Penguins lost in seven games to the New York Rangers despite having a 3–1 series lead. This marked the fourth time the Penguins lost a best-of-seven playoff series after having a 3–1 series lead, and the second time doing so against the New York Rangers. The Game 7 loss marked the first time the Penguins lost a Game 7 on the road in franchise history after going 6–0 the previous six instances.

In the first 64 games, the Penguins were 39–16–9 for 87 points. But, after that, they sagged, going 7–9–2. They also lost an NHL-worst 7 shootouts.

Before the season, the Penguins shipped left wing Brandon Tanev off to play for the Seattle Kraken.

Standings

Divisional standings

Conference standings

Schedule and results

Regular season
The regular season schedule was released on July 22, 2021. 

|- style="background:#cfc;"
| 1 || October 12 || Pittsburgh || 6–2 || Tampa Bay || Jarry || 19,092 || 1–0–0 || 2 || 
|- style="background:#ffc;"
| 2 || October 14 || Pittsburgh || 4–5  || Florida || DeSmith || 14,308 || 1–0–1 || 3 || 
|- style="background:#cfc;"
| 3 || October 16 || Chicago || 2–5 || Pittsburgh || Jarry || 18,420 || 2–0–1 || 5 || 
|- style="background:#ffc;"
| 4 || October 19 || Dallas || 2–1  || Pittsburgh || Jarry || 16,450 || 2–0–2 || 6 || 
|- style="background:#cfc;"
| 5 || October 23 || Toronto || 1–7 || Pittsburgh || Jarry || 15,397 || 3–0–2 || 8 || 
|- style="background:#fcf;"
| 6 || October 26 || Tampa Bay || 5–1 || Pittsburgh || Jarry || 15,732 || 3–1–2 || 8 || 
|- style="background:#fcf;"
| 7 || October 28 || Calgary || 4–0 || Pittsburgh || DeSmith || 17,743 || 3–2–2 || 8 || 
|- style="background:#fcf;"
| 8 || October 30 || New Jersey || 4–2 || Pittsburgh || Jarry || 17,452 || 3–3–2 || 8 || 
|-

|- style="background:#cfc
| 9 || November 4 || Philadelphia || 2–3  || Pittsburgh || Jarry || 17,037 || 4–3–2 || 10 || 
|- style="background:#ffc
| 10 || November 6 || Minnesota || 5–4  || Pittsburgh || Jarry || 17,181 || 4–3–3 || 11 || 
|- style="background:#ffc
| 11 || November 9 || Pittsburgh || 2–3  || Chicago || Jarry || 17,736 || 4–3–4 || 12 || 
|- style="background:#cfc
| 12 || November 11 || Florida || 2–3  || Pittsburgh || Jarry || 17,194 || 5–3–4 || 14 || 
|- style="background:#fcf
| 13 || November 13 || Pittsburgh || 3–6 || Ottawa || DeSmith || 14,661 || 5–4–4 || 14 || 
|- style="background:#fcf
| 14 || November 14 || Pittsburgh || 1–6 || Washington || Jarry || 18,573 || 5–5–4 || 14 || 
|- style="background:#fcf
| 15 || November 16 || Buffalo || 2–1 || Pittsburgh || Jarry || 16,366 || 5–6–4 || 14 || 
|- style="background:#cfc
| 16 || November 18 || Pittsburgh || 6–0 || Montreal || Jarry || 20,712 || 6–6–4 || 16 || 
|- style="background:#cfc
| 17 || November 20 || Pittsburgh || 2–0 || Toronto || Jarry || 19,531 || 7–6–4 || 18 || 
|- style="background:#cfc
| 18 || November 22|| Pittsburgh || 3–1 || Winnipeg || Jarry || 13,570 || 8–6–4 || 20 || 
|- style="background:#cfc
| 19 || November 24 || Vancouver || 1–4 || Pittsburgh || Jarry || 17,590 || 9–6–4 || 22 || 
|- style="background:#cfc
| 20 || November 26 || Pittsburgh || 1–0 || NY Islanders || Jarry || 17,255 || 10–6–4 || 24 || 
|- style="background:#fcf
| 21 || November 27 || Montreal || 6–3 || Pittsburgh || DeSmith || 17,985 || 10–7–4 || 24 || 
|- style="background:#ffc
| 22 || November 29 || Pittsburgh || 1–2  || Calgary || Jarry || 15,343 || 10–7–5 || 25 || 

|- style="background:#fcf
| 23 || December 1 || Pittsburgh || 2–5 || Edmonton  || Jarry || 17,130 || 10–8–5 || 25 || 
|- style="background:#cfc
| 24 || December 4 || Pittsburgh || 4–1 || Vancouver || Jarry || 18,422 || 11–8–5 || 27 || 
|- style="background:#cfc
| 25 || December 6 || Pittsburgh || 6–1 || Seattle || DeSmith || 17,151 || 12–8–5 || 29 || 
|- style="background:#cfc
| 26 || December 10 || Pittsburgh || 4–2 || Washington || Jarry || 18,573 || 13–8–5 || 31 || 
|- style="background:#cfc
| 27 || December 11 || Anaheim || 0–1 || Pittsburgh || DeSmith || 17,435 || 14–8–5 || 33 || 
|- style="background:#cfc
| 28 || December 14 || Montreal || 2–5 || Pittsburgh || Jarry || 17,005 || 15–8–5 || 35 || 
|- style="background:#cfc
| 29 || December 17 || Buffalo || 2–3 || Pittsburgh || Jarry || 17,456 || 16–8–5 || 37 || 
|- style="background:#cfc
| 30 || December 19 || Pittsburgh || 3–2 || New Jersey || Jarry || 14,857 || 17–8–5 || 39 || 
|- style="background:#ccc
| — || December 21 || New Jersey || – || Pittsburgh || colspan="5"|Postponed due to COVID-19.
|- style="background:#ccc
| — || December 23 || Philadelphia  || – || Pittsburgh || colspan="5"|Postponed due to COVID-19.
|- style="background:#ccc
| — || December 27 || Pittsburgh || – || Boston || colspan="5"|Postponed due to COVID-19.
|- style="background:#ccc
| — || December 29 || Pittsburgh || – || Toronto || colspan="5"|Postponed due to COVID-19.
|- style="background:#ccc
| — || December 31 || Pittsburgh || – || Ottawa || colspan="5"|Postponed due to attendance restrictions.
|-

|- style="background:#cfc;"
| 31 || January 2 || San Jose || 5–8 || Pittsburgh || DeSmith || 18,066 || 18–8–5 || 41 || 
|- style="background:#cfc;"
| 32 || January 5 || St. Louis || 3–5 || Pittsburgh || Jarry || 17,921 || 19–8–5 || 43 || 
|- style="background:#cfc;"
| 33 || January 6 || Pittsburgh || 6–2 || Philadelphia || Jarry || 17,944 || 20–8–5 || 45 || 
|- style="background:#fcf;"
| 34 || January 8 || Pittsburgh || 2–3 || Dallas || Jarry || 18,532 || 20–9–5 || 45 || 
|- style="background:#cfc;"
| 35 || January 11 || Pittsburgh || 4–1 || Anaheim || Jarry || 11,431 || 21–9–5 || 47 || 
|- style="background:#fcf;"
| 36 || January 13 || Pittsburgh || 2–6 || Los Angeles || Jarry || 14,348 || 21–10–5 || 47 || 
|- style="background:#cfc;"
| 37 || January 15 || Pittsburgh || 2–1  || San Jose || Domingue || 13,686 || 22–10–5 || 49 || 
|- style="background:#cfc;"
| 38 || January 17 || Pittsburgh || 5–3 || Vegas || Jarry || 18,213 || 23–10–5 || 51 || 
|- style="background:#cfc;"
| 39 || January 20 || Ottawa || 4–6 || Pittsburgh || Jarry || 18,060 || 24–10–5 || 53 || 
|- style="background:#cfc;"
| 40 || January 21 || Pittsburgh || 5–2 || Columbus || Jarry || 18,477 || 25–10–5 || 55 || 
|- style="background:#cfc;"
| 41 || January 23 || Winnipeg || 2–3  || Pittsburgh || Jarry || 17,962 || 26–10–5 || 57 || 
|- style="background:#cfc;"
| 42 || January 25 || Arizona || 3–6 || Pittsburgh || Jarry || 16,360 || 27–10–5 || 59 || 
|- style="background:#ffc;"
| 43 || January 27 || Seattle || 2–1  || Pittsburgh || Jarry || 18,228 || 27–10–6 || 60 || 
|- style="background:#ffc;"
| 44 || January 28 || Detroit || 3–2  || Pittsburgh || DeSmith || 18,369 || 27–10–7 || 61 || 
|- style="background:#fcf;"
| 45 || January 30 || Los Angeles || 4–3 || Pittsburgh || Jarry || 18,237 || 27–11–7 || 61 || 
|-

|- style="background:#ffc;"
| 46 || February 1 || Washington || 4–3  || Pittsburgh || Jarry || 17,826 || 27–11–8 || 62 || 
|- style="background:#cfc;"
| 47 || February 8 || Pittsburgh || 4–2 || Boston || Jarry || 17,850 || 28–11–8 || 64 || 
|- style="background:#cfc;"
| 48 || February 10 || Pittsburgh || 2–0 || Ottawa || DeSmith || 500 || 29–11–8 || 66 || 
|- style="background:#cfc;"
| 49 || February 13 || Pittsburgh || 4–2 || New Jersey || Jarry || 11,242 || 30–11–8 || 68 || 
|- style="background:#cfc;"
| 50 || February 15 || Philadelphia || 4–5  || Pittsburgh || DeSmith || 18,385 || 31–11–8 || 70 || 
|- style="background:#fcf;"
| 51 || February 17 || Pittsburgh || 1–4 || Toronto || Jarry || 8,139 || 31–12–8 || 70 || 
|- style="background:#fcf;"
| 52 || February 20 || Carolina || 4–3 || Pittsburgh || Jarry || 18,429 || 31–13–8 || 70 || 
|- style="background:#fcf;"
| 53 || February 24 || New Jersey || 6–1 || Pittsburgh || Jarry || 18,057 || 31–14–8 || 70 || 
|- style="background:#cfc;"
| 54 || February 26 || NY Rangers || 0–1 || Pittsburgh || Jarry || 18,413 || 32–14–8 || 72 ||  
|- style="background:#cfc;"
| 55 || February 27 || Pittsburgh || 3–2 || Columbus || DeSmith || 17,072 || 33–14–8 || 74 || 
|-

|- style="background:#cfc;"
| 56 || March 3 || Pittsburgh || 5–1 || Tampa Bay || Jarry || 19,092 || 34–14–8 || 76 || 
|- style="background:#ffc;"
| 57 || March 4 || Pittsburgh || 2–3  || Carolina || DeSmith || 19,023 || 34–14–9 || 77 || 
|- style="background:#fcf;"
| 58 || March 8 || Florida || 4–3 || Pittsburgh || Jarry || 17,876 || 34–15–9 || 77 || 
|- style="background:#cfc;"
| 59 || March 11 || Vegas || 2–5 || Pittsburgh || Jarry || 18,341 || 35–15–9 || 79 || 
|- style="background:#cfc;"
| 60 || March 13 || Carolina || 2–4 || Pittsburgh || Jarry || 17,866 || 36–15–9 || 81 || 
|- style="background:#fcf;"
| 61 || March 15 || Pittsburgh || 1–4 || Nashville || DeSmith || 17,498 || 36–16–9 || 81 || 
|- style="background:#cfc;"
| 62 || March 17 || Pittsburgh || 3–2  || St. Louis || Jarry || 18,096 || 37–16–9 || 83 || 
|- style="background:#cfc;"
| 63 || March 19 || Pittsburgh || 4–1 || Arizona || Jarry || 14,507 || 38–16–9 || 85 || 
|- style="background:#cfc;"
| 64 || March 22 || Columbus || 1–5 || Pittsburgh || Jarry || 18,196 || 39–16–9 || 87 || 
|- style="background:#ffc;"
| 65 || March 23 || Pittsburgh || 3–4  || Buffalo || DeSmith || 9,399 || 39–16–10 || 88 || 
|- style="background:#fcf;"
| 66 || March 25 || Pittsburgh || 1–5 || NY Rangers || Jarry || 18,006 || 39–17–10 || 88 || 
|- style="background:#cfc;"
| 67 || March 27 || Detroit || 2–11 || Pittsburgh || Jarry || 17,842 || 40–17–10 || 90 || 
|- style="background:#fcf;"
| 68 || March 29 || NY Rangers || 3–2 || Pittsburgh || Jarry || 18,011 || 40–18–10 || 90 || 
|- style="background:#cfc;"
| 69 || March 31 || Pittsburgh || 4–3  || Minnesota || DeSmith || 18,978 || 41–18–10 || 92 || 
|-

|- style="background:#fcf;"
| 70 || April 2 || Pittsburgh || 2–3 || Colorado || Jarry || 18,102 || 41–19–10 || 92 || 
|- style="background:#fcf;"
| 71 || April 5 || Colorado || 6–4 || Pittsburgh || Jarry || 17,409 || 41–20–10 || 92 || 
|- style="background:#fcf;"
| 72 || April 7 || Pittsburgh || 0–3 || NY Rangers || Jarry || 16,694 || 41–21–10 || 92 || 
|- style="background:#fcf;"
| 73 || April 9 || Washington || 6–3 || Pittsburgh || Jarry || 18,404 || 41–22–10 || 92 || 
|- style="background:#cfc;"
| 74 || April 10 || Nashville || 2–3  || Pittsburgh || DeSmith || 17,553 || 42–22–10 || 94 || 
|- style="background:#ffc;"
| 75 || April 12 || Pittsburgh || 4–5  || NY Islanders || DeSmith || 15,924 || 42–22–11 || 95 || 
|- style="background:#cfc;"
| 76 || April 14 || NY Islanders || 3–6 || Pittsburgh || Jarry || 18,236 || 43–22–11 || 97 || 
|- style="background:#fcf;"
| 77 || April 16 || Pittsburgh || 1–2 || Boston || DeSmith || 17,850 || 43–23–11 || 97 || 
|- style="background:#cfc;"
| 78 || April 21 || Boston || 0–4 || Pittsburgh || DeSmith || 18,350 || 44–23–11 || 99 || 
|- style="background:#cfc;"
| 79 || April 23 || Pittsburgh || 7–2 || Detroit || DeSmith || 19,515 || 45–23–11 || 101 || 
|- style="background:#fcf;"
| 80 || April 24 || Pittsburgh || 1–4 || Philadelphia || Domingue || 18,601 || 45–24–11 || 101 || 
|- style="background:#fcf;"
| 81 || April 26 || Edmonton || 5–1 || Pittsburgh || DeSmith || 17,804 || 45–25–11 || 101 || 
|- style="background:#cfc;"
| 82 || April 29 || Columbus || 3–5 || Pittsburgh || DeSmith || 18,402 || 46–25–11 || 103 || 
|- 

|- style="text-align:center;"
| Legend:       = Win       = Loss       = OT/SO Loss

Playoffs

|- style="background:#cfc;"
| 1 || May 3 || Pittsburgh || 4–3 || NY Rangers || 3OT || Domingue || 18,006 || 1–0 || 
|- style="background:#fcf;"
| 2 || May 5 || Pittsburgh || 2–5 || NY Rangers ||  || Domingue || 18,006 || 1–1 || 
|- style="background:#cfc;"
| 3 || May 7 || NY Rangers || 4–7 || Pittsburgh ||  || Domingue || 18,385 || 2–1 || 
|- style="background:#cfc;"
| 4 || May 9 || NY Rangers || 2–7 || Pittsburgh ||  || Domingue || 18,392 || 3–1 || 
|- style="background:#fcf;"
| 5 || May 11 || Pittsburgh || 3–5 || NY Rangers ||  || Domingue || 18,006 || 3–2 || 
|- style="background:#fcf;"
| 6 || May 13 || NY Rangers || 5–3 || Pittsburgh ||  || Domingue || 18,342 || 3–3 || 
|-style="background:#fcf;"
| 7 || May 15 || Pittsburgh || 3–4 || NY Rangers || OT || Jarry || 18,006 || 3–4 || 

|-
| ''Legend:       = Win       = Loss

Player statistics

Skaters

Goaltenders

†Denotes player spent time with another team before joining the Penguins. Stats reflect time with the Penguins only.
‡Denotes player was traded mid-season. Stats reflect time with the Penguins only.
Bold/italics denotes franchise record.

Transactions
The Penguins have been involved in the following transactions during the 2021–22 season.

Trades

Notes:
 Pittsburgh receives the pick if they reach the 2022 Stanley Cup Finals and Beaulieu plays in at least 50% of the playoff games.

Players acquired

Players lost

Signings

Draft picks

Below are the Pittsburgh Penguins' selections at the 2021 NHL Entry Draft, which were held on July 23 to 24, 2021. It was held virtually via Video conference call from the NHL Network studio in Secaucus, New Jersey.

References

Pittsburgh Penguins seasons
Penguins
2021 in sports in Pennsylvania
2022 in sports in Pennsylvania